Bonding may refer to:

Arts and entertainment
 Bonding (TV series), a 2019 Netflix Original TV series
 "Bonding" (Kim Possible), a 2004 episode of the television series Kim Possible
 "The Bonding", a 1989 episode of the television series Star Trek: The Next Generation
 The Bonding (album), a 2013 album by Austrian symphonic metal band Edenbridge

Other uses
 Bonding (dental), a dental procedure in which a dentist applies a resin material to the tooth

See also
 Human bonding
 Female bonding
 Male bonding
 Channel bonding (or modem bonding), an arrangement in which two or more network interfaces on a host computer are combined
 NIC bonding, an alternate name for link aggregation
 Electrical bonding, practice of connecting all metal objects in a room to protect from electric shock
 Bonding, a method for creating electric interconnects:
 Ball bonding, a method very similar to wire bonding
 Chip bonding, a method of wiring some chips (also from different manufactures) together on die an integrated circuit
 Wire bonding, a method of making interconnections between a microchip and the outside world as part of semiconductor device fabrication